New England Triptych is an orchestral composition by American composer William Schuman, based on works of William Billings. The work lasts about 16 minutes, and is written for an orchestra comprising three flutes (3rd doubling piccolo), two oboes, English horn, E-flat clarinet, two clarinets, bass clarinet, two bassoons, four horns, three trumpets, three trombones, tuba, timpani, percussion (bass drum, cymbals, snare drum, tenor drum), and strings.

Overview
Subtitled "Three Pieces for Orchestra After William Billings", New England Triptych is basically an expansion of Schuman's 1943 William Billings Overture (premiered by Artur Rodziński and the New York Philharmonic in 1944 but never published, and since withdrawn by the composer). New England Triptych was written in 1956 and premiered on October 28 of that year by the Orchestra of the University of Miami under the direction of Andre Kostelanetz, who had commissioned it.

Schuman prefaced his score with this note (and reprinted the pertinent texts for each hymn):

The first movement, "Be Glad then, America", is built on these lines from Billings' text:

After a short introduction by solo timpani, the strings develop music that suggests the "Halleluyah" of the end. Trombones and trumpets start the main section in a varied setting of the words "Be Glad then, America, Shout and Rejoice." The solo timpani returns, leading to a fugal section based on the words "And Ye Shall Be Satisfied." The music gains momentum as combined themes lead to a climax, followed by a free adaptation of Billings' "Halleluyah" music and a final reference to the "Shout and Rejoice" music.

The second movement, "When Jesus Wept", begins with a solo by bassoon and soon  the bassoon is accompanied by oboe.  "When Jesus Wept" is a round and uses Billings' music in its original form. .

The third movement, "Chester", is perhaps Billings' best known tune. Originally a church hymn, it was adopted by the Continental Army as a marching song. The orchestral piece derives both from the spirit of the hymn and the marching song:

New England Triptych has become one of the works most indelibly associated with William Schuman. It also exists in an arrangement by the composer for concert band although the "Chester" movement was revised and lengthened.

Recordings
Antal Doráti recorded New England Tripych for London Records (OS 26442) with the National Symphony Washington DC on 23-26 & 30 April 1975 and it was released in December 1976 on LP, in the US only. A CD issue has been published by The Doráti Edition (ADE 050).

References

External links
Presser Perusal Score (at Issuu.com) (with preface)

Compositions by William Schuman
Compositions for symphony orchestra
Concert band pieces
Orchestral suites
1956 compositions